The Pearl Sessions is a compilation album by Janis Joplin released in 2012. It contains alternate takes of the songs that constituted the album Pearl  posthumously released by Columbia Records in 1971. Recordings of Joplin and producer Paul Rothchild talking between takes give the listener insight into their creative musical process.

Track listing

Personnel
 Janis Joplin – vocals, guitar on "Me and Bobby McGee"
 Richard Bell – piano
 Ken Pearson – organ
 John Till – electric guitar
 Brad Campbell – bass guitar
 Clark Pierson – drums

Additional personnel
 Bobby Womack – acoustic guitar on "Trust Me"
 Bobbye Hall – conga, percussion
 Phil Badella, John Cooke, Vince Mitchell – backing vocals
 Sandra Crouch – tambourine
 Phil Macy - engineer
 Vic Anesini - mastering

References 

Janis Joplin compilation albums
2012 compilation albums
Compilation albums published posthumously